Graeme Lee Torrilla (born 3 September 1997) is a Gibraltarian footballer who plays as a midfielder for Lincoln Red Imps and the Gibraltar national team.

Club career
Torrilla joined Lincoln Red Imps from Mons Calpe in January 2020.

International career
Torrilla made his international debut for Gibraltar on 5 September 2020 in the UEFA Nations League against San Marino. He scored on his debut, the only goal in a 1–0 home win for Gibraltar.

Career statistics

International

International goals

References

External links
 
 
 

1997 births
Living people
Gibraltarian footballers
Gibraltar youth international footballers
Gibraltar under-21 international footballers
Gibraltar international footballers
Association football midfielders
Lions Gibraltar F.C. players
Mons Calpe S.C. players
Lincoln Red Imps F.C. players